Kalyug (Age of vice) is a 1981 Indian Hindi-language crime drama film, directed by Shyam Benegal. It is known as a modern-day adaption of the Indian epic Mahabharat, depicting an archetypal conflict between rival business houses. Kalyug went on to win the Filmfare Award for Best Film in 1982 and was among the only three Indian films which were submitted to the Academy Awards. The film also went in Berlin International Film Festival for best screenplay and Shashi Kapoor’s phenomenal acting who played the central role of Karna in the epic film was also praised.

Shashi Kapoor, Rekha, Raj Babbar, Supriya Pathak, Anant Nag, Kulbhushan Kharbanda, Sushma Seth, Akash Khurana, Victor Bannerjee, Reema Lagoo, and A.K. Hangal  played major roles, while Urmila Matondkar appeared as a child artist. The film had its world premiere at the 12th Moscow International Film Festival. on 21 July 1981 and was released theatrically in India on 24 July 1981.

Cast
 Shashi Kapoor as Karan Singh/Karna
 Rekha as Supriya/Draupadi
 Raj Babbar as Dharam Raj/Yudhisthira
 Kulbhushan Kharbanda as Bal Raj/Bhima
 Victor Bannerjee as Dhan Raj/Duryodhana
 A.K. Hangal as Bhisham Chand/Bhishma
 Sushma Seth as Savitri/Kunti
 Anant Nag as Bharat Raj/Arjuna
 Akash Khurana as Sandeep Raj
 Supriya Pathak as Subhadra
 Amrish Puri as Kishan Chand/Krishna
 Om Puri as Bhavani Pandey

Plot
This is a tale of intrigue, plots and the inevitable war between two families.

Ramchand and Bhishamchand were two pioneering brothers in business. Bhishamchand, a lifelong bachelor, brought up the two sons of Ramchand upon his demise. He also gave the family business a firm foundation. Khubchand, the elder son of Ramchand begets two sons, Dhanraj and Sandeepraj. Puranchand, Khubchand's younger brother, had died a few years ago. His three sons are Dharamraj, Balraj and Bharatraj. Another player in the game is Karan, an orphan brought up by Bhishamchand.

A series of events brings the long-hidden feud between the two families to light. Despite Bhishamchand's efforts to mediate between the two, the situation gets out of hand and events take a tragic turn. Dhanraj's men accidentally kill the young son of Balraj and to take revenge, Bharatraj murders Karan. Quite a few skeletons from the family cupboard are brought into the open that only add to the tensions and hatred, finally culminating in the destruction of the two families, showing the brittleness of our moral fabric.

Reception
Madhu Trehan of India Today wrote ″Kalyug, as most film-goers have learnt to expect from Shyam Benegal, is different. The film demands that it be seen slowly, mulled over carefully and, preferably, as in all epics, seen again. Benegal snips away at a richly labyrinthia if tapestry of his own making of two battling industrial families destroying each other, leaving nothing but shreds of torn broken thread.″ Anil Dharker, writing for International Film Guide, wrote a positive review, calling it "ambitious" and noting it as "the most complex of Benegal's films so far", which is "carefully paced" and "expertly put together". Dharker praised the cinematographic work and the acting: "Govind Nihalani, Benegal's regular cameraman, highlights each shifting mood with skillful lighting. The cast, most of it Benegal regulars, is excellent, with virtuoso performances from Victor Banerjee, and Shashi Kapoor..."

Awards 
29th Filmfare Awards

Won

 Best Film – Shashi Kapoor
 Best Supporting Actress – Supriya Pathak
 Best Sound Design – Hitendra Ghosh

Nominated
 Best Director – Shyam Benegal
 Best Story – Shyam Benegal, Girish Karnad

References

External links 
 

1981 films
1980s Hindi-language films
Films directed by Shyam Benegal
Films based on the Mahabharata
1980s business films
Indian business films